The 2014–2015 Cyclo-cross Superprestige events and season-long competition took place between 5 October 2014 and 14 February 2015. This was the first season after Niels Albert gave a press-conference that he had to stop competitive cycling because of a heart condition. Meanwhile, Sven Nys was going this season for his 14th title in the Cyclo-cross Superprestige.

Results

Season standings
In each race, the top 15 riders gain points, going from 15 points for the winner decreasing by one point per position to 1 point for the rider finishing in 15th position. In case of ties in the total score of two or more riders, the following tie breakers exist: most races started, most races won, best result in the last race.

References

External links

S
S
Cyclo-cross Superprestige